Thania Papas St. John is an American television producer and writer.

For much of her career she has written and produced for a number of notable television series including 21 Jump Street, Life Goes On, Lois & Clark: The New Adventures of Superman, Buffy the Vampire Slayer, Roswell, Wild Card, Huff, Eureka, Drop Dead Diva and Unnatural History.

In 1997 she created the television series Crisis Center.

She adapted The Witcher short stories into Netflix's The Witcher tv series, released in 2019.

She graduated from Harvard University in 1983 and is one of the founding members of the League of Hollywood Women Writers.

References

External links

Television producers from Illinois
American women television producers
American television writers
Harvard University alumni
Living people
Writers from Chicago
American women television writers
Year of birth missing (living people)
Screenwriters from Illinois
21st-century American women